The Balinese script, natively known as  and , is an abugida used in the island of Bali, Indonesia, commonly for writing the Austronesian Balinese language, Old Javanese, and the liturgical language Sanskrit. With some modifications, the script is also used to write the Sasak language, used in the neighboring island of Lombok. The script is a descendant of the Brahmi script, and so has many similarities with the modern scripts of South and Southeast Asia. The Balinese script, along with the Javanese script, is considered the most elaborate and ornate among Brahmic scripts of Southeast Asia.

Though everyday use of the script has largely been supplanted by the Latin alphabet, the Balinese script has a significant prevalence in many of the island's traditional ceremonies and is strongly associated with the Hindu religion. The script is mainly used today for copying  or palm leaf manuscripts containing religious texts.

Characteristics
Pure Balinese can be written with 18 consonant letters and 9 vowel letters, while Sanskrit transliteration or loan words from Sanskrit and Old Javanese utilizes the full set. A set of modified letters are also used for writing the Sasak language. Each consonant has a conjunct form called gantungan which nullifies the inherent vowel of the previous syllable.

Punctuation includes a comma, period, colon, as well as marks to introduce and end section of a text. Musical notation uses letter-like symbols and diacritical marks in order to indicate pitch information. Text are written left to right without word boundaries (Scriptio continua).

There is also a set of "holy letters" called  which appears in religious texts and protective talismans. Most of them are constructed using diacritic  with corresponding characters. A number of additional characters, known to be used inline in text (as opposed to decoratively on drawings), remains under study and those characters are expected to be proposed as Balinese extensions in due course.

Letters
A basic letter in Balinese is called , and each letter stands for a syllable with inherent vowel /a/.

Consonants 
Balinese script has 33 consonants, of which only 18 called  are used for writing basic vocabulary in Balinese language. The consonants can be arranged into Sanskrit order and  traditional order.

traditional order 
The consonants can be arranged in  traditional order. The sequence forms a poem of 4 verses narrating the myth of Aji Saka. However, this table below include  as the current romanization have no diacritics for the consonants.

Sanskrit order 
As other Brahmic scripts, consonants in Balinese script can be arranged into Tamil / Sanskrit order. Thus, Balinese script had been influenced by Kalvi / Shiksha. The table below uses the order.

. They are, in traditional order: ha na ca ra ka / da ta sa wa la / ma ga ba nga / pa ja ya nya.

 The consonant  is sometimes not pronounced. For example,   (lit. rain) is pronounced .
However, the independent form is included in Unicode.
   
 Actually an alveolar consonant, but classified as dental by tradition
 The former of the two letter forms is more frequently used.

Vowels 
They are described in the following list:

and  
Thus, as other members of the Brahmic family (Javanese), the consonant cluster is written cursively.

Diacritics 

Diacritics (, pronounced , also known as  when referring to the Javanese script) are symbols that cannot stand by themselves. When they are attached to the independent letters, they affect the pronunciation.

() change the inherited vowel of a consonant letter. For example, the letter  with  becomes ;  with  becomes . The diacritics in this category are summarized in the following list:

Many consonants can form ligatures with tedung:

(), except , adds a final consonant to a syllable.

 is zero vowel diacritics as in other Brahmic scripts in Balinese script. , as virama in Devanagari, suppress the inherent vowel  in the consonant letter.  is used on impossibility of gantungan and gempelan usage such as succeeded by punctuation marks, attachment of two or more gantungan to one letter (lit. three layers), preservation of combination (rather than ) and disambiguation.

Numerals 

Balinese numerals are written in the same manner as Arabic numerals. For example, 25 is written with the Balinese numbers 2 and 5. 

If the number is written in the middle of a text, carik has to be written before and after the number to differentiate it from the text. Below is an example of how a date is written using Balinese numerals (date: 1 July 1982, location: Bali):

Other symbols 
There are some special symbols in the Balinese script. Some of them are punctuation marks, and the others are religious symbols. The symbols are described in the following list:

Orthography

Balinese language

Loanword from Sanskrit and Old Javanese 
Balinese have many loanwords from Sanskrit and Old Javanese. In general, the Balinese orthography in Balinese script preserve the original orthography. The preservation of original orthography result on several rules: 
 assimilation rule, which based on articulation rule (Kalvi / Shiksha),
  rule, which the word is spelled based on the source,
  rule, which several words has doubled consonant.

Assimilation 
Assimilation in Balinese occurs within the conjuncts/consonant clusters. Balinese script represents assimilation occurred, however Latin script sometimes may not represent this. In general, alveolar consonants are assimilated into palatal, retroflex or labial. There are more specific descriptions in assimilation combination:
  [n] assimilated into  [ɲ] if succeeded by palatal consonants, such as consonant cluster nc  and nj .
  [s] assimilated into  [ɕ] if succeeded by palatal consonants, such as consonant cluster sc .
  [d] assimilated into   [dʒ] if succeeded by palatal consonants, such as consonant cluster dny .
  [n] assimilated into  [ɳ] if preceded by retroflex consonants, such as consonant cluster rn .
  [s] assimilated into  [ʂ] if succeeded by retroflex consonants, such as consonant cluster st (ṣṭ)  and sn (ṣṇ) .
  [n] assimilated into  [m] if succeeded by labial consonants.

Liquid Consonant-Schwa Combination 

Latin Script Transliteration 
Latin script transliteration into Balinese script is based on phonetics. As vocabulary expands, foreign sounds are introduced and have no equivalent on Balinese script. In general, transliteration of foreign sounds is shown as below.

Sasak language 
The Sasak language, spoken in Lombok Island east of Bali, is related to Balinese, is written in a version of the Balinese script known as Aksara Sasak, which is influenced by the Javanese script and is given additional characters for loanwords of foreign origin.

Fonts
There are some fonts for Balinese script as of 2016. Bali Simbar, Bali Galang, JG Aksara Bali, Aksara Bali, Tantular Bali, Lilitan, Geguratan and Noto Sans Balinese are some fonts that included Balinese script. The fonts have different degree of compatibility each other, and most contain critical flaws.

Bali Simbar is first font for Balinese script by I Made Suatjana Dipl Ing at 1999. Bali Simbar is not compatible for Mac-OS and Unicode. JG Aksara Bali, was designed by Jason Glavy, has over 1400 Balinese glyphs, including a huge selection of precomposed glyph clusters. The latest version of JG Aksara Bali is released on 2003, thus has no compatibility with Unicode. Bali Simbar and JG Aksara Bali, in particular, may cause conflicts with other writing systems, as the font uses code points from other writing systems to complement Balinese's extensive repertoire as Balinese script was not included in Unicode at the creation time.

Aksara Bali by Khoi Nguyen Viet is the first hacked Unicode Balinese font with a brute-force OpenType implementation. The results depend on how well other OpenType features are implemented in the renderer. The font has about 370 Balinese glyphs, but does not display the vowel  correctly. The team of Aditya Bayu Perdana, Ida Bagus Komang Sudarma, and Arif Budiarto has created a small series of Balinese fonts: Tantular Bali, Lilitan, and Geguratan, all using hacked Unicode and a brute-force OpenType implementation. Tantular has about 400 Balinese glyphs. These all have serious flaws.

Another Unicode font is Noto Sans Balinese from Google. However, Noto Sans Balinese exhibits several critical flaws, such as an inability to correctly display more than one diacritic per consonant.

It also automatically assimilates some consonants within words. It displays corresponding Balinese glyphs instead of Latin letters.

Unicode 

Balinese script was added to the Unicode Standard in July, 2006 with the release of version 5.0.

The Unicode block for Balinese is U+1B00–U+1B7F:

Examples
Article 1 of the Universal Declaration of Human Rights:

[All human beings are born free and equal in dignity and rights. They are endowed with reason and conscience and should act towards one another in a spirit of brotherhood.]

Kakawin Bhāratayuddha Pasalin 1 Verse 1 (wirama jagaddhita):

Gallery

References

Further reading

External links

 Outline of Balines script  at BASAbali.org
 Entry on Balinese at Omniglot.com -- A guide to writing systems
 Computerization of Balinese Script
 Unicode block
 Balinese character picker
 Balinese script converter

Brahmic scripts
Balinese language
Indonesian scripts
Scripts with ISO 15924 four-letter codes